is a Japanese female singer who debuted in 1975. Her younger sister Yoshimi Iwasaki is also a singer. In 1981 she was awarded the Silver Prize at the Tokyo Music Festival for her song "Koimachigusa".

Her representative songs are "" — "Romance" (1975), "" — "Shishūki" (1977) and "" — "Madonna Tachi No Lullaby" (1982). However, her most immediately recognizable hit song, "" — "Cinderella Honeymoon" (1978) has been such a consistent feature of monomane talent Korokke's routines, Hiromi Iwasaki has commented that when the intro played in concerts, fans would laugh, so she has ceremonially "gifted" that song to Korokke, whose performance has elongated both their careers.

Biography
Iwasaki made her official debut in April 1975 with the single "" — "Dyuetto", after winning a record contract on the popular Japanese talent competition show Star Tanjō! in the summer of 1974. The single peaked at no. 19, according to the Oricon charts. Its follow up, "Romance", peaked at no. 1, maintained its place for three weeks, and sold over a million units. It was written by Yu Aku and Kyohei Tsutsumi, and got her nominated for The Best Newcomer of the Year at the 17th edition of the Japan Record Awards, and made her first performance on the 26th edition of Kohaku Uta Gassen with this song. The disco inspired "Sentimental"  was issued as a single in October of that same year, and with sales exceeding 700,000, became her second no. 1 hit, and maintained its place for two weeks. A string of hit singles was released throughout 1976 and 1977, most notably "Fantasy" (which peaked at no. 2), "Mirai" (no. 2), "Kiri No Meguri Ai" (no. 4), "Dream" (no. 4). and "Nettaigyo" (no. 4). The single "Shishūki" was released in late '77, and won her an award at the 19th edition of the Japan Record Awards, as well as an award at the 8th edition of the Japan Music Awards.

She continued to release big selling singles throughout the 1970s, and starred in her first rock opera, in the summer of 1979, as Ophelia in Shakespeares' Hamlet. In late '79 her single "Mangekyō", won her gold at the Japan Record Awards, as well as becoming the theme song for Subaru Leone.

The single "Sumire Iro No Namida" won her the "Best vocal performance" at the Japan Record Awards of 1981. "Sumire Iro No Namida" had sold 500,000 copies by September 1982.

In 1982 the song "Madonna Tachi No Lullaby" became her third no. 1; selling over a million units, and winning gold at the 21st edition of the Japan Record Awards.

In the 1980s Iwasaki began focusing on musicals, and in 1987 played Fantine in the Japanese version of Les Misérables. To this day she continues acting, singing, performing and hosting.

Discography

Charted Singles

Charted albums

References

External links 
  

1959 births
Living people
Japanese women singers
Singers from Tokyo
Singing talent show winners